La Troncal Canton is a canton of Ecuador, located in the Cañar Province.  Its capital is the town of La Troncal.  Its population at the 2001 census was 44,268.

References

Cantons of Cañar Province